Justin Ray "J. R."  Giddens (born February 13, 1985) is an American former professional basketball player. He was selected with the 30th overall pick in the 2008 NBA Draft by the Boston Celtics out of the University of New Mexico. He initially played for the University of Kansas but transferred following his sophomore season. He is the former Head Coach of the women’s basketball team at Northern New Mexico College in Española, NM.

College
Giddens accepted a scholarship offer from University of Kansas from then-head coach Roy Williams. After Williams left, Giddens was persuaded to stay by Williams' replacement Bill Self. In his first year at Kansas, Giddens earned All-Big 12 Conference Freshman honors while averaging 11 points per game. In May 2005 he was involved in a fight outside a bar in Lawrence and received a stab wound. He was later charged with battery for his role in the incident and left Kansas in a mutual agreement with Self. Giddens transferred to New Mexico and sat out the next season due to NCAA regulations. As a junior, he was suspended from the team in late February for disciplinary reasons and missed the team's summer trip to work on his academics. New Mexico hired head coach Steve Alford, who took a no-nonsense approach to discipline, and Giddens made a dramatic transformation. As a senior, he was named Mountain West Conference Co-Player of the Year and Honorable Mention All-American following career highs in points (16.3 per game) and rebounds (8.8 per game).

Professional career
On June 26, 2008, Giddens was selected by the Boston Celtics with the 30th overall pick in the 2008 NBA Draft. He had worked out with the Celtics for three days, and received praises from head coach Doc Rivers, who thought he could fight for minutes on the team right away. He was even mentioned as a possible replacement for restricted free agent Tony Allen. Giddens was already familiar with Leon Powe and Kendrick Perkins, who were his teammates at the 2003 McDonald's All-American Game. But on behalf of his agent Aaron Mintz, Giddens declined to work out at the Celtics' minicamp in early July, because he had not signed a contract yet.

On November 15, 2008, Giddens was assigned to the Boston Celtics' NBA Development League affiliate team, the Utah Flash. He had played with the Celtics in the 2008–09 pre-season but had been on the inactive list for the first 10 games of the regular season.  He was recalled by the Celtics from Utah Flash development team on February 8, 2009.

Giddens started his first game for the Boston Celtics on January 2, 2010.

On February 18, 2010, Giddens, Bill Walker and Eddie House were traded to the New York Knicks for Nate Robinson and Marcus Landry.

On October 13, 2010, Giddens's agent said that Giddens would spend the 2010–11 season with Asseco Prokom Gdynia in Poland, but Giddens left the team in December 2010 by mutual consent.

In September 2011, Giddens signed with PAOK Thessaloniki of Greece.

In September 2012, Giddens signed with Basket Brescia Leonessa, an Italian Legadue team.

On June 30, 2014, he signed with Vaqueros de Bayamón of Puerto Rico.

On November 22, 2014, Giddens signed with Peñarol de Mar del Plata of Argentina. On March 10, 2015, he was waived by the Peñarol after appearing in seventeen LNB games.

In January 2017, Giddens signed with Club Trouville of the Liga Uruguaya de Basketball. The next month, he left the club after appearing in five games. On February 22, 2017, he signed with Mexican club Mineros de Parral.

On March 22, 2018, Giddens signed with Ferro Carril Oeste of the Liga Nacional de Básquet in Argentina.

Stabbing incident
On May 19, 2005, Giddens was stabbed in his right calf in a bar fight in Lawrence, Kansas, requiring 30 stitches.

Personal
 Majored in university studies.
Cleared  as a high jumper in high school.
His parents are Charles and Dianna, and he has two sisters, Breeanna and Portia.
Lists Steve Urkel and Mr. Rogers as his favorite television characters.
 Has sixteen tattoos, including his first initial "J" on his left triceps and his last initial "G" on his right triceps, and the Bible verse Philippians 4:13 – "I can do all things through Christ who gives me strength" – on his right shoulder.

NBA career statistics

Regular season 

|-
| align="left" | 
| align="left" | Boston
| 6 || 0 || 1.3 || .667 || – || – || .5 || .0 || .2 || .0 || .7
|-
| align="left" | 
| align="left" | Boston
| 21 || 1 || 4.7 || .429 || .000 || .500 || 1.0 || .3 || .2 || .0 || 1.1
|-
| align="left" |  
| align="left" | New York
| 11 || 0 || 12.7 || .487 || .000 || .636 || 2.8 || .6 || .5 || .1 || 4.1
|-
| align="left" | Career
| align="left" |
| 38 || 1 || 6.5 || .476 || .000 || .565 || 1.4 || .3 || .3 || .1 || 1.9

References

External links
 J. R. Giddens Euroleague.net Profile
 J. R. Giddens Player Info @ DraftExpress.com
 J. R. Giddens – New Mexico Player Bio
 J. R. Giddens Draft 2008 Profile @ NBA.com
 Trying to get past his past – The Boston Globe

1985 births
Living people
American expatriate basketball people in Argentina
American expatriate basketball people in Chile
American expatriate basketball people in the Dominican Republic
American expatriate basketball people in Greece
American expatriate basketball people in Italy
American expatriate basketball people in Mexico
American expatriate basketball people in Poland
American expatriate basketball people in Spain
American expatriate basketball people in Uruguay
Basketball players from Oklahoma
Basket Brescia Leonessa players
Boston Celtics draft picks
Boston Celtics players
Correcaminos UAT Victoria players
Halcones de Ciudad Obregón players
Kansas Jayhawks men's basketball players
Maine Red Claws players
McDonald's High School All-Americans
New Mexico Lobos men's basketball players
New Mexico Thunderbirds players
New York Knicks players
P.A.O.K. BC players
Parade High School All-Americans (boys' basketball)
Asseco Gdynia players
Shooting guards
Sportspeople from Oklahoma City
Utah Flash players
Valencia Basket players
American men's basketball players